Bueres is one of ten parishes (administrative divisions) in Caso, a municipality within the province and autonomous community of Asturias, in northern Spain. 

 in size with a population of 166 (INE 2007).  The postal code is 33990.

Villages
 Bueres
 Gobezanes
 Nieves

Parishes in Caso